My Kid Could Paint That is a 2007 documentary film by director Amir Bar-Lev.  The movie follows the early artistic career of Marla Olmstead, a young girl from Binghamton, New York who gains fame first as a child prodigy painter of abstract art, and then becomes the subject of controversy concerning whether she truly completed the paintings herself or did so with her parents' assistance and/or direction. The film was bought by Sony Pictures Classics in 2007 after premiering at the Sundance Film Festival.

Taglines
 "Inspiration or Manipulation? You Decide."
 "American dream or art world scheme?"

Summary
Marla's father, an amateur painter, describes how Marla watches him paint, wants to help, and is given her own canvas and supplies. A friend asks to hang Marla's pictures in his coffee shop and is surprised when people ask to buy them. A local newspaper reporter, Elizabeth Cohen, writes a piece about Marla, after first asking her parents if they really want her to do so. Cohen's story is picked up by The New York Times, and Marla becomes a media celebrity, with appearances on television and shows at galleries in New York and Los Angeles. Sales of her work earn over $300,000.

The tone of the documentary turns with a scene of Marla's parents watching a February 2005 report by CBS News' 60 Minutes II that questions whether Marla painted the works attributed to her. 60 Minutes enlisted the help of Ellen Winner, a child psychologist who studies cognition in the arts and gifted children. Seeing video images of some of the paintings attributed to Marla, Winner initially reacts positively, stating: "It's absolutely beautiful. You could slip it into the Museum of Modern Art and absolutely get away with it." The 60 Minutes reporter, Charlie Rose, then shows Winner what he describes as "50 minutes of videotape shot by us and by Marla's parents." After seeing this footage, Winner states: "This is eye-opening to me, to see her actually painting." Rose asks her how this is "eye-opening." Winner responds: "Because she's not doing anything that a normal child wouldn't do. She's just kind of slowly pushing the paint around."

Rose then states that after "our interview," the Olmsteads agreed to permit CBS crews to set up a hidden camera in their home to tape their daughter painting a single piece in five hours over the course of a month.  When Winner reviewed the tapes, the psychologist said, "I saw no evidence that she was a child prodigy in painting. I saw a normal, charming, adorable child painting the way preschool children paint, except that she had a coach that kept her going." Winner also indicated that the painting created before CBS's hidden camera looked "less polished than some of Marla's previous works." Asked to explain the difference, Winner states: "I can only speculate. I don't see Marla as having made, or at least completed, the more polished looking paintings, because they look like a different painter. Either somebody else painted them start to finish, or somebody else doctored them up. Or, Marla just miraculously paints in a completely different way than we see on her home video."

Marla's parents film her creating a second work, Ocean, but Bar-Lev is not fully convinced.  A couple are shown considering the purchase of Ocean. The woman complains that Ocean does not look like the other works by Marla. They buy it anyway.  In a slide show, Bar-Lev compares Ocean with the 60 Minutes piece and then with several other works attributed to Marla. Viewers are left to make their own judgments.

The film also raises questions about the nature of art, especially abstract expressionism, the nature of the documentary process, and the perception that the media imparts fame to subjects only to later subject them to intense scrutiny and criticism.

Reception
In his October 2007 review of Bar-Lev's film, Roger Ebert stated: "My own verdict as an outsider is, no, Marla didn't paint those works, although she may have applied some of the paint. In the last analysis, I guess it all reduces to taste and instinct. Some paintings are good, says me, or says you, and some are bad. Some paintings could be painted by a child, some couldn't be."

In his review of Bar-Lev's film, LA Weekly'''s art critic Doug Harvey reveals a different viewpoint. "The works created by Marla on camera are different from some of her canvasses, similar to others and better than many. Bar-Lev’s big reveal is a bust, and turns what could have been a compelling inquiry into the machinations of the art market and media into a tawdry embarrassment. Apart from the questionable ethics, it’s lousy art. In the final analysis, the filmmaker’s crisis of faith is unconvincing, except as one of a series of blatantly manipulative decisions that, despite the lack of any kind of empirical evidence, bolsters the most commercially viable story that can be milked from the situation — the one where Marla’s parents are supernaturally cunning con artists out to exploit the gullibility of the deluded collectors of essentially fraudulent modern art."

As of May 2021, the film holds a 94% "Fresh" rating at the review aggregator website Rotten Tomatoes, based on 83 reviews.

Post-release events
As of October 2007, the Olmstead's website displays videos of Marla working on three more canvases, Fairy Map, Rabbit, and Colorful Rain. The videos employ the jump-cut technique, meaning that the scene (a shot of the canvas on which Marla paints) is generally continuous, but that the action stops and then starts again with the subject (Marla) having shifted position relative to the video frame. As of August 2008, the website depicts 49 canvases it says have been sold and 16 more available for sale, including two of the three works featured in the videos, Rabbit, and Colorful Rain. In a 2015 interview, Marla, then a high school sophomore, said she hasn't seen the movie and doesn't remember the events. She  still paints but has other interests as well.

See alsoF for Fake'', a 1974 Orson Welles documentary which also raised questions about who gets to decide what is and is not art.

References

External links
Movie official website

 

interview with My Kid Could Paint That director Amir Bar-Lev at Filmmaker Magazine
IONCINEMA.com interview with Amir Bar-Lev
Marla Olmstead's website
Videos of Marla Olmstead painting
Academic review of My Kid Could Paint That

2007 films
American documentary films
British documentary films
Documentary films about children
Documentary films about the media
Documentary films about painters
Sony Pictures Classics films
2007 documentary films
Films directed by Amir Bar-Lev
2000s English-language films
2000s American films
2000s British films